Datuk Seri Haji Ahmad bin Maslan (born 30 April 1966) is a Malaysian politician who has served as the Deputy Minister of Finance I in the Pakatan Harapan (PH) administration under Prime Minister and Minister Anwar Ibrahim since December 2022 as well as the Member of Parliament (MP) for Pontian since March 2008. He served as the Deputy Minister of International Trade and Industry, Deputy Minister of Finance and Deputy Minister in the Prime Minister's Department in the Barisan Nasional (BN) administration under former Prime Minister Najib Razak and former Ministers Nor Mohamed Yakcop, Najib, Ahmad Husni Hanadzlah, Mustapa Mohamed and Ong Ka Chuan from April 2009 to the collapse of the BN administration in May 2018. He is a member of the United Malays National Organisation (UMNO), a component party of the BN coalition. He has also served as Secretary-General of UMNO since March 2020 and also of BN from January 2021 to June 2021. He has also served as Division Chairman of UMNO of Pontian since March 2023. He also served as the Division Deputy Chairman of UMNO of Pontian from 2008 to his promotion to the division chairmanship in March 2023.

Early life and education
Ahmad Maslan was born on 30 April 1966 at Kampung Parit Yusuf, Lubok Sipat, Benut, Pontian, Johor to rubber tapping parents. He graduated the Bachelor of Economics and Political Science from the Victoria University of Wellington and received Master of Business Administration from the Universiti Kebangsaan Malaysia.

Political career
Ahmad bin Maslan has been the information chief of United Malays National Organisation (UMNO), an appointed party position, from 2009 until 29 January 2016 when he was appointed as the party's new Information Technology (IT) bureau chief.

He was first elected as MP in the 2008 general election for the federal seat of Pontian, previously held by Hasni Mohamad of UMNO. In April 2009 he was appointed as a Deputy Minister in the Prime Minister's Department. After successfully defended his seat in 2013 general election, he was picked as the Deputy Finance Minister. On 3 April 2017, he was appointed as Deputy Minister of International Trade and Industry (MITI). He got reelected in 2018 general election but Barisan Nasional became the opposition coalition.

Personal life
Ahmad Maslan is married to Noraini Sulaiman. The couple has three children.

Election results

Honours
  :
  Grand Commander of the Order of the Territorial Crown (SMW) - Datuk Seri (2018)
  :
  Companion Class I of the Order of Malacca (DMSM) - Datuk (2009)

See also
Pontian (federal constituency)

External links
 Official blog

References

Living people
1966 births
People from Johor
Malaysian people of Malay descent
Malaysian Muslims
United Malays National Organisation politicians
Members of the Dewan Rakyat
Victoria University of Wellington alumni
National University of Malaysia alumni
21st-century Malaysian politicians